Gorji Rural District is a rural district (dehestan) in the Central District of Buin va Miandasht County, Isfahan Province, Iran. At the 2006 census, its population was 606, in 125 families.  The rural district has 1 village.

References 

Rural Districts of Isfahan Province
Buin va Miandasht County